Jeff is an unincorporated community in Jackson Township, Wells County, in the U.S. state of Indiana.

History
Jeff is believed to be named after Jeff Jones, the son of a local landowner.

A post office was established at Jeff in 1891, and remained in operation until it was discontinued in 1903.

Geography

References

Unincorporated communities in Wells County, Indiana
Unincorporated communities in Indiana